Cathal Berry is an Irish Independent politician and retired soldier who has been a Teachta Dála (TD) for the Kildare South constituency since the 2020 general election.

Military service
Originally from Ballyduff, County Waterford, Berry joined the army at the age of 18. Berry was a career Line Infantry officer and served for six years as the second-in-command (2IC) of the Army Ranger Wing, Ireland's special operations unit, before qualifying as a medical doctor and becoming the head of the Military Medical School of the Irish Defence Forces. He deployed overseas five times, with NATO in Kosovo, the EU in Chad and the UN in the Middle East (Lebanon).

Berry came to public attention in 2019, unusual for a soldier, particularly with service in the ARW, when upon retiring after 23 years in the Defence Forces, he spoke to the media about poor pay and conditions within the military and the disillusionment of military personnel with the perceived dysfunctional relationship between the military authorities and the Department of Defence.

Berry called for the resignation of Paul Kehoe, Minister of State at the Department of Defence from 2011 to 2020, whom he described as an "empty suit" who has "presided over the demise of the Defence Force".

Education
Berry holds a Bachelors degree in Science and Master of Law in Peace Support Operations and International Humanitarian Law from NUI Galway, a Bachelor of Medicine, Obstetrics and Surgery from the Royal College of Surgeons in Ireland as well as qualifications in French language, and leadership, management and defence studies from NUI Maynooth.

Political career
Berry was elected to Dáil Éireann as an Independent TD for the Kildare South constituency at the 2020 general election. His campaign platform was "health, housing, the environment, education and Defence Force families".

References

Alumni of the University of Galway
Alumni of Maynooth University
Alumni of the Royal College of Surgeons in Ireland
Independent TDs
Military personnel from County Waterford
Irish officials of the United Nations
Living people
Members of the 33rd Dáil
United Nations Military Observers (people)
Year of birth missing (living people)